The women's marathon at the 2011 IPC Athletics World Championships was held in the streets of Christchurch, New Zealand on 30 January.

British athlete Shelly Woods, on January 29, pulled out of the marathon for safety reasons, as the roads around the circuit would not be closed to traffic.

Classification T54 event.

Medalists

T54
The Women's marathon, T54 was held on January 30

T54 = normal upper limb function, partial to normal trunk function, may have significant function of the lower limbs.

Results

Key:   DNS = did not start

See also
List of IPC world records in athletics

References
General
Schedule and results, Official site of the 2011 IPC Athletics World Championships
IPC Athletics Classification Explained, Scottish Disability Sport
Specific

Marathon
2011 in women's athletics
Marathons at the World Para Athletics Championships
IPC World Championships